Mt. Garfield is the high point of the Book Cliffs, east-northeast of Grand Junction, and overlooking the town of Palisade. Two classic hiking trails ascend the mountain. The mountain was named after President James Garfield a year after Garfield's death. The mountain is composed of Mesaverde Group overlaying Mancos Shale.

References

Garfield
Garfield